50 for 50 is a three-disc compilation album by the English progressive rock band Jethro Tull, released in 2018. Released to commemorate the band's 50th anniversary, the collection includes 50 tracks, selected by frontman Ian Anderson himself, released between 1968 and 2003.

Track listing

All songs written by Ian Anderson, except where noted.

50th Anniversary Collection 

50th Anniversary Collection  is a single-disc greatest hits album by the English progressive rock band Jethro Tull, released in 2018. The album is a summary of 50 for 50, containing the same cover in a different color. The tracklist was selected by Anderson himself.

Track listing

Charts
Chart information for 50 for 50 only, not 50th Anniversary Collection:

References

Jethro Tull (band) compilation albums
Chrysalis Records compilation albums
2018 compilation albums